James H. Walker (May 31, 1885 – December 1, 1954) was a farmer, provincial-level politician and World War I-era soldier. He served as a member of the Legislative Assembly of Alberta from  1940 to 1944. During that time he served as official opposition leader twice and was leader of the Independents.

Early life 
Walker served in World War I. He attained the rank of Major and ran in the 1917 Alberta general election soldiers and nurses vote. In that vote he finished in eighth place out of 21 candidates.

He was involved in large scale farming in Raymond, Alberta. He specialized in growing sugar beets, and became chairman of the Beet Growing Industry. He also primarily raised sheep on his farm.

Political career 
Walker would return to provincial politics running as a United Farmers of Alberta candidate in the 1935 Alberta general election. He was defeated by Social Credit candidate Solon Earl Low, finishing a distant second place, but still ahead of incumbent Frank Leffingwell.

Walker himself would run for a second time in the Warner electoral district against Low. He was an Independent candidate this time around and defeated Low.

Walker would run for leadership of the Independent Citizen's Association and defeat David Elton on a first ballot win at Calgary on January 23, 1944. His win would make him the first permanent leader of the Independents.

Walker had trouble gaining traction as leader. Prior to the start of the 4th Legislative session, the Independents lost two caucus members who joined Joseph Trembley to sit in the Assembly as Liberals. The Independents, despite knowing about the timing of the 1944 Alberta general election well in advance, failed to field a full slate of candidates. The party and Walker were criticized heavily as being unable to form government and unable to be a viable alternative. On elections night, Social Credit under Ernest Manning surged in popularity and the Independents were returned in just three seats.

Walker was personally defeated in his own electoral district by Low and did not return to provincial politics.

References

External links 
 Legislative Assembly of Alberta Members Listing

Independent Alberta MLAs
Canadian military personnel of World War I
1954 deaths
1885 births
People from Raymond, Alberta
United Farmers of Alberta politicians
Farmers from Alberta